The Census Act (Northern Ireland) 1969 (1969 c. 8) was an Act of the Parliament of Northern Ireland, which was passed on 24 June 1969. It enabled ministers to order a census of population in Northern Ireland at intervals of five years or more. The Act shares similarities with the Census Act 1920 which provides for censuses in England, Scotland, and Wales. It remains the primary legislation for conducting censuses in Northern Ireland.

Schedule
The Schedule to the Act list the 'Matters in respect of which particulars may be required'. They are:
 Names, sex, age.
 Occupation, profession, trade or employment.
 Nationality, birthplace, race, language.
 Place of abode and character of dwelling.
 Condition as to marriage, relation to head of family, issue.
 Education, professional and technical qualifications.
 Religion.
 Any other matters with respect to which it is desirable to obtain statistical information with a view to ascertaining the social condition of the population.

See also
 Census in the United Kingdom

References

External links
 NI 2001 Census Evaluation Report – Legislation, Northern Ireland Statistics and Research Agency

Acts of the Parliament of Northern Ireland 1969
Censuses in the United Kingdom